The Wiluna uranium mine is a proposed uranium mine in Western Australia. The original proposal was to establish open cut mines at Lake Way and Centipede deposits. In 2013, the Wiluna project became the first uranium mine to receive all necessary approvals in the state of Western Australia since the ban on uranium mining was repealed there in 2008. Federal environmental approval for the mine's development was granted under the EPBC Act in April 2013.

Status 
Toro Energy had planned to commission and construct the mine in 2013 and make their first sales in 2014 or 2015 but as of 2020, mining is yet to commence.

The project has sought extensions to the original project to include additional deposits Lake Maitland and Millipede. An expansion of the project was approved by the EPA in 2016.

The mine was originally proposed to operate for 14 years, producing  of Uranium oxide over that period, though more recent projects suggest 16 years of mining potential.

Once operating, containers of uranium oxide would be transported to Port Adelaide and exported from there.

References

External links
 
 MINEDEX website: Lake Way / Toro Database of the Department of Mines, Industry Regulation and Safety

Uranium mining in Western Australia
Mines in Western Australia
Shire of Wiluna
Uranium mines in Australia